Emil Donchev (born 12 April 1988) is a Bulgarian retired footballer who played as a central and left defender.

Career
He was raised in Spartak Varna's youth teams.

External links
 

Bulgarian footballers
1988 births
Living people
Association football midfielders
First Professional Football League (Bulgaria) players
PFC Spartak Varna players